Shahrak-e Vali-ye Asr (also Romanized as Shahrak-e Valī-ye ʿAṣr) is a village in Kafsh Kanan Rural District, in the Central District of Bahmai County, Kohgiluyeh and Boyer-Ahmad Province, Iran. At the 2006 census, its population was 1,050, in 213 families.

References 

Populated places in Bahmai County